Putte is a municipality located in the Belgian province of Antwerp. In 2021, Putte had a total population of 18,109. The total area is 34.96 km2.

Putte should not be confused with the homonymous municipality in the region of Kempen, split by the border into Putte, Netherlands and Putte, Kapellen.

See also
 Van de Putte and Van der Putten

References

External links

Official website - Available only in Dutch

 
Municipalities of Antwerp Province
Populated places in Antwerp Province